In the theory of Lie algebras, an  sl2-triple is a triple of elements of a Lie algebra that satisfy the commutation relations between the standard generators of the special linear Lie algebra sl2. This notion plays an important role in the theory of semisimple Lie algebras, especially in regard to their nilpotent orbits.

Definition 
Elements {e,h,f} of a Lie algebra g form an  sl2-triple if

 

These commutation relations are satisfied by the generators

 

of the Lie algebra sl2 of 2 by 2 matrices with zero trace. It follows that sl2-triples in g are in a bijective correspondence with the Lie algebra homomorphisms from sl2 into g.

The alternative notation for the elements of an sl2-triple is {H, X, Y}, with H corresponding to h, X corresponding to e, and Y corresponding to f. H is called a neutral, X is called a nilpositive, and Y is called a nilnegative.

Properties 

Assume that g is a finite dimensional Lie algebra over a field of characteristic zero.
From the representation theory of the Lie algebra sl2, one concludes that the Lie algebra g decomposes into a direct sum of finite-dimensional subspaces, each of which is isomorphic to Vj, the (j + 1)-dimensional simple sl2-module with highest weight j. The element h of the sl2-triple is semisimple, with the simple eigenvalues j, j − 2, …, −j on a submodule of g isomorphic to Vj . The elements e and f move between different eigenspaces of h, increasing the eigenvalue by 2 in case of e and decreasing it by 2 in case of f. In particular, e and f are nilpotent elements of the Lie algebra g.

Conversely, the Jacobson–Morozov theorem states that any nilpotent element e of a semisimple Lie algebra g can be included into an sl2-triple {e,h,f}, and all such triples are conjugate under the action of the group ZG(e), the centralizer of e in the adjoint Lie group G corresponding to the Lie algebra g.

The semisimple element h of any sl2-triple containing a given nilpotent element e of g is called a characteristic of e.

An sl2-triple defines a grading on g according to the eigenvalues of h:

 

The sl2-triple is called even if only even j occur in this decomposition, and odd otherwise.

If g is a semisimple Lie algebra, then g0 is a reductive Lie subalgebra of g (it is not semisimple in general). Moreover, the direct sum of the eigenspaces of h with non-negative eigenvalues is a parabolic subalgebra of g with the Levi component g0.

If the elements of an sl2-triple are regular, then their span is called a principal subalgebra.

See also
Affine Weyl group
Finite Coxeter group
Hasse diagram
Linear algebraic group
Nilpotent orbit
Root system
Special linear Lie algebra
Weyl group

References 

 A. L. Onishchik, E. B. Vinberg, V. V. Gorbatsevich, Structure of Lie groups and Lie algebras. Lie groups and Lie algebras, III. Encyclopaedia of Mathematical Sciences, 41. Springer-Verlag, Berlin, 1994. iv+248 pp. (A translation of  Current problems in mathematics. Fundamental directions. Vol. 41, Akad. Nauk SSSR, Vsesoyuz. Inst. Nauchn. i Tekhn. Inform., Moscow, 1990. Translation by V. Minachin. Translation edited by A. L. Onishchik and E. B. Vinberg) 
 V. L. Popov, E. B. Vinberg,  Invariant theory. Algebraic geometry. IV. Linear algebraic groups. Encyclopaedia of Mathematical Sciences, 55. Springer-Verlag, Berlin, 1994. vi+284 pp. (A translation of  Algebraic geometry. 4, Akad. Nauk SSSR Vsesoyuz. Inst. Nauchn. i Tekhn. Inform., Moscow, 1989. Translation edited by A. N. Parshin and I. R. Shafarevich) 

Lie algebras